A social purpose corporation (SPC) is a type of for-profit entity, a corporation, in some U.S. states that enables, but does not require, considering social or environmental issues in decision making. SPCs are similar to benefit corporations (B corporations) and flexible purpose corporations (FPCs).

California 
In California, "[t]he amendment, S.B. 1301, changes existing law (found under Corporations Code Sections 2500–3503) to emphasize the social-purpose nature of the flexible purpose corporations, most notably by changing its name to the "Social Purpose Corporation". With the law change, corporate directors are now required to account for company mission in decision making. A SPC must state that it has a specific purpose to pursue a public purpose that a traditional nonprofit corporation would normally have pursued. Because an SPC is a for-profit organization, they do not qualify for tax-exempt status as a nonprofit corporation.

S.B. 1301 takes effect on January 1, 2015. On that date, extant FPCs will automatically continue their existence as SPCs.

Florida 
Florida created both social purpose corporations and benefit corporations in 2014. The main difference between the two is that B corporations must pursue a "general public benefit", which applies to all of the company's activities, while SPCs may pursue a public benefit in limited areas. This example from the Florida Bar Journal illustrates this difference between SPCs and benefit corporations:

Shareholders, directors, and persons owning more than 5% equity in a Florida SPC may bring lawsuits against a Florida SPC for failure to pursue or create a public benefit, but the corporations, their directors, and their management are shielded from monetary damages in such lawsuits for failing to create a public benefit. Florida SPCs must prepare an annual report on the company's achievements towards its public benefit goals, but unlike Florida B Corporations, these reports do not need to be assessed by a third-party standard.

Washington 
Washington State passed the law for social purpose corporations in 2012. Florida became the second state to adopt social purpose corporations in 2014. Although there are no official requirements for social purpose corporations to have a positive social or environmental impact, most of the companies which have registered as social purpose corporations in Washington State, the pioneering state for SPCs, have a focus on social or environmental impacts.

See also 

B Corporation (certification)
Flexible purpose corporation
Community contribution company
Community interest company
Social entrepreneurship
Low-profit limited liability company

References 

Types of business entity
Corporate law
Corporate governance in the United States
Business models
Social economy in the United States
Social entrepreneurship
Public economics
Benefit corporations